Fever Fever may refer to:

 Fever Fever (album), by Puffy AmiYumi, 1999
 Fever Fever (band), an American Christian rock band
 "Fever Fever", a song by Melody Club from Scream, 2006
 "Fever, Fever", a song by Gizmo Varillas

See also
 Fever (disambiguation)